Farkhor, also called Parkhar, is a city in southwestern Tajikistan, located on the border with Afghanistan. It is the capital of Farkhor District in Khatlon Region. The population of the town is 25,300 (January 2020 estimate). The Farkhor Air Base is about 4 km south-west of Farkhor.

References

Populated places in Khatlon Region